The 22nd Sunday in Ordinary Time Sessions is an EP in preparation for a second album by Rob Dougan, released on May 9, 2015, alongside a film of the orchestra on Gumroad.

The recording and 20-minute film of the sessions features a 75-piece orchestral and 40-piece choir, five instrumental songs, and was recorded at London's Air Lyndhurst Studios.

Track listing

References

External links
The 22nd Sunday in Ordinary Time Sessions on Gumroad
The 22nd Sunday in Ordinary Time Sessions on Discogs

Rob Dougan albums
2015 debut EPs